Tighanimine is a town in Batna Province, north-eastern Algeria. It is located on Abiod Valley. There are some small Ancient Roman ruins nearby.

References 

Communes of Batna Province